The voiced linguolabial nasal is a type of consonantal sound used in some spoken languages.

Features 

Features of the voiced linguolabial nasal:

Occurrence

References

External links
 

Linguolabial consonants
Pulmonic consonants
Nasal consonants